Em (М м; italics: М м) is a letter of the Cyrillic script.

Common Glagolitic script is "Ⰿ and Ⱞ"

It is derived from the Greek letter Mu (Μ μ).

Usage
As used in the alphabets of various languages, Em represents the following sounds:
 palatalized bilabial nasal consonant 

The pronunciations shown in the table are the primary ones for each language; for details consult the articles on the languages.

Related letters and other similar characters
Μ μ : Greek letter Mu
M m : Latin letter M
Ӎ ӎ : Cyrillic letter Em with tail

Computing codes

References

External links